All the Truth That's in Me is a 2013 young adult novel by Julie Berry. The novel tells the story of Judith, a young woman from a deeply religious community who is kidnapped for two years and brought back with her tongue partially removed. The story deals with her life after returning and how she is treated by the village.

All the Truth That's in Me was shortlisted for the Carnegie Medal in 2014.

Reception
All the Truth That's in Me is a Junior Library Guild selection.

The novel was generally well received by critics, including starred reviews from Booklist, Kirkus Reviews, Publishers Weekly, and  Kirkus Reviews called the novel "a tale of uncommon elegance, power and originality." Publishers Weekly indicated that Berry's "poetic narrative ... will draw readers in, and the gradual unveiling of secrets will keep them absorbed."

Reviewing the novel in the New York Times, Jennifer Hubert Swan called All the Truth That's in Me "disturbing and provocative."

Writing for The Guardian, Safah called the novel " a dark and chilling tale of abuse and secrets, of love and loss, of silence and courage." Safah further highlighted Berry's writing style, writing that the novel's "second person narration was one so unique and almost lyrical, with a rhythm and a kind of music I've never read before. Each chapter is usually only half a page long, sometimes less, it keeps with the way Judith might think, in short sequences. She's a very calculating kind of person and seems to always see deeper than others, as if her lack of speech opened her eyes and ears to a far more intricate world only she can see and the narration portrayed it wonderfully."

Abigail Packard, writing for Children's Book and Media Review, called the novel "very powerful," highlighting how "Berry has created strikingly real and believable characters." She further noted, "The language of the story is beautiful and some of the scenes are intensely powerful as Berry delves into the minds of her characters."

The audiobook edition, narrated by Kathleen McInerney, received a starred review from Booklist and School Library Journal, who noted, "Kathleen McInferney reads the story using different tones for each character. Her voice for Judith is spot-on in the way she addresses both her internal voice and her speech impediment." Publishers Weekly similarly wrote, "The narrator also provides distinct character voices that are varied and appropriate. However, McInerney is at her best when rendering Judith’s thoughts and vocalizing the character’s inner frustration."

Kirkus Reviews, School Library Journal, The Horn Book Magazine named All the Truth That's in Me one of the best young adult novels of the 2013.

References

2013 American novels
Viking Press books